The 2008 African Fencing Championships were held in Casablanca, Morocco from 26 to 28 April.

Medal summary

Men's events

Women's events

Medal table
 Host

References

2014
African Fencing Championships
International fencing competitions hosted by Egypt
2014 in Egyptian sport